Midlothian is a historic county, registration county, lieutenancy area and one of 32 council areas of Scotland used for local government. Midlothian lies in the east-central Lowlands, bordering the City of Edinburgh, East Lothian and the Scottish Borders.

Midlothian emerged as a county in the Middle Ages under larger boundaries than the modern council area, including Edinburgh itself. The county was formally called the "shire of Edinburgh" or Edinburghshire until the twentieth century. It bordered West Lothian to the west, Lanarkshire, Peeblesshire and Selkirkshire to the south, and East Lothian, Berwickshire and Roxburghshire to the east. Traditional industries included mining, agriculture and fishing – although the modern council area is now landlocked.

History

Following the end of the Roman occupation of Britain, Lothian was populated by Brythonic-speaking ancient Britons and formed part of Gododdin, within the Hen Ogledd or Old North. In the seventh century, Gododdin fell to the Angles, with Lothian becoming part of the kingdom of Bernicia. Bernicia united into the Kingdom of Northumbria which itself became part of the early Kingdom of England. Lothian came under the control of the Scottish monarchy in the tenth century.

In the Middle Ages, Lothian was the scene of several historic conflicts between the kingdoms of Scotland and England. The Battle of Roslin took place in 1303 at Roslin as part of the First War of Scottish Independence. A Scottish army led by Simon Fraser and John Comyn defeated an army led by English commander John Segrave.

Along with other parts of the Lothians, the county was involved in the Rough Wooing when Roslin Castle, seat of the Earl of Caithness, was destroyed in 1544 by forces of Henry VIII of England.

In the 17th century, the county featured in the War of the Three Kingdoms, where General George Monck had his base at Dalkeith Castle as the Commonwealth's Commander in Scotland. Following the Restoration of the monarchy, the "Pentland Rising" in the region culminated with the Battle of Rullion Green in 1666, a decisive victory for the Government forces against Covenanter rebels.

In 1650, Oliver Cromwell's army came to Dalkeith. His officer General George Monck, was Commander in Scotland, and the government of the country was based out of Dalkeith castle.

The 1878-80 Midlothian campaign by British Liberal politician William Ewart Gladstone entered history as an early example of modern political campaigning, resulting in Gladstone taking the Midlothian constituency from the long-time Conservative Member of Parliament William Montagu Douglas Scott and going on to become Prime Minister of the United Kingdom. 

On 1 June 1978, Midlothian became Sister Cities with Midlothian, Illinois.

Governance
The modern council area of Midlothian is governed by Midlothian Council, based in Dalkeith.

Shire and county
The origins of the historic county of Midlothian are obscure; it emerged as a shire (the area controlled by a sheriff) in the Middle Ages, and was certainly in existence by the reign of David I (reigned 1124–1153). It covered the central part of the former kingdom or province of Lothian, and was formally called the "shire of Edinburgh" or "Edinburghshire", although the alternative name "Midlothian" was also used from a very early date. The burgh of Edinburgh became administratively independent from the surrounding county in 1482 when James III granted the burgh the right to appoint its own sheriff and coroner, making it a county of itself.

Commissioners of Supply were established for each shire in 1667, and served as the main administrative body for the county until elected county councils were created in 1890 under the Local Government (Scotland) Act 1889, taking most of the commissioners' functions. The commissioners for Edinburghshire, and the county council which followed them, did not have jurisdiction over the city of Edinburgh, which was administered by the town council of the burgh.

From its creation in 1890 the county council called itself "Midlothian County Council". However, the legal name of the county remained the "county of Edinburgh" or "Edinburghshire". In 1913 the county council petitioned the government to formally change the name to Midlothian. The government responded that it would direct all government departments to use Midlothian rather than Edinburghshire, but that a formal change of name needed to be done by statute and it could not justify the parliamentary time to make such a change. The statutory change of name from Edinburghshire to Midlothian eventually took place in 1947, under section 127 of the Local Government (Scotland) Act 1947.

Midlothian County Council was based at Midlothian County Buildings, built in 1904 on George IV Bridge in Edinburgh on the site of the earlier County Buildings.

Midlothian was abolished as a county for local government purposes in 1975. The boundaries of the historic county of Midlothian, including the city of Edinburgh, are still used for some limited official purposes connected with land registration, being a registration county.

District
Midlothian County Council was abolished in 1975 under the Local Government (Scotland) Act 1973, which abolished Scotland's counties and burghs as administrative areas and created a new two-tier system of upper-tier regions and lower-tier districts. Most of Midlothian's territory went to a new district called Midlothian within the Lothian region. The Midlothian district was smaller than the area of the pre-1975 county, with the parts of the pre-1975 county going to other districts being:
Currie, Balerno, Ratho and Newbridge to the city of Edinburgh.
Musselburgh burgh and parish of Inveresk (which included the villages of Inveresk, Wallyford and Whitecraig) to East Lothian.
The Calders (East Calder, Midcalder and West Calder) and the Midlothian part of Livingston to West Lothian.
Heriot and Stow parishes to the Ettrick and Lauderdale district of the Borders region.

For lieutenancy purposes, the last lord-lieutenant of the county of Midlothian was made lord-lieutenant for the new district of Midlothian when the reforms came into effect in 1975. The former county council's headquarters in Edinburgh became the offices of the new Lothian Regional Council, whilst the Midlothian District Council established its headquarters in Dalkeith. In 1991 the council built itself a new headquarters called Midlothian House at 40-46 Buccleuch Street in Dalkeith.

Council area

The Lothian region was abolished in 1996. The four districts in the region, including Midlothian, became unitary council areas. The reconstituted Midlothian Council continues to be based at Midlothian House in Dalkeith. The Midlothian lieutenancy area corresponds to the current council area rather than the historic county.

Central government
There is a Midlothian constituency of the House of Commons.

There was a Midlothian constituency of the Scottish Parliament up to the 2011 elections when it was divided between Midlothian North and Musselburgh and Midlothian South, Tweeddale and Lauderdale.

Geography

The Midlothian council area contains the towns of Dalkeith, Bonnyrigg and Penicuik, as well as a portion of the Pentland Hills Regional Park, Rosslyn Chapel and Dalkeith Palace.

The historic county has a roughly trapezoidal shape; it consists of a fairly flat area along the Firth of Forth, which is heavily urbanised and dominated by the Edinburgh conurbation. Off the coast lie the small islands of Inchmickery and Cramond Island. The land gradually rises to the south, with the Pentland Hills in the south-west, Moorfoot Hills in the centre-south and the Lammermuir Hills in the far south-east. Blackhope Scar on the border with Peeblesshire is the highest point in the county at 651 m (2,136 ft). The county contains no lochs of any size, though there are many reservoirs, most notably Gladhouse Reservoir, Rosebery Reservoir, Edgelaw Reservoir, Loganlea Reservoir, Glencorse Reservoir, Threipmuir Reservoir, Harlaw Reservoir, Harperrig Reservoir, Crosswood Reservoir, Morton Reservoir and Cobbinshaw Reservoir.

Settlements

Settlements within both historic and modern Midlothian

Arniston
Auchendinny
Bilston
Bonnyrigg
Borthwick
Carrington
Cornbank
Cousland
Crichton
Dalkeith
Danderhall
Deanburn
Dewartown
Easthouses
Easter Howgate
Edgehead
Eight Mile Burn
Eskbank
Fala
Ford
Gorebridge
Gowkshill
Hillend
Hopefield
Howgate
Lasswade
Leadburn
Loanhead
Mayfield
Millerhill
Milton Bridge
Newbattle
Newtongrange
Nine Mile Burn
North Middleton
Pathhead
Penicuik
Polton
Rosewell
Roslin
Shawfair
Silverburn
Straiton
Temple
Whitehill
Woodburn

Settlements historically in Midlothian but since transferred elsewhere

Transferred to the City of Edinburgh

Abbeyhill
Alnwickhill
Ardmillan
Baberton
Balerno
Balgreen
Bankhead
Barnton
Beechmount
Bingham
Blackford
Blackhall
Bonaly
Bonnington
Braepark
Broomhouse
Broughton
Brunstane
Bruntsfield
Bughtlin
Burdiehouse
Burghmuirhead
The Calders
Cameron Toll
Cammo
Canongate
Canonmills
Chesser
Church Hill
Clermiston
Comely Bank
Comiston
Corstorphine
Cowgate
Craigcrook
Craigentinny
Craigleith
Craiglockhart
Craigmillar
Craigour
Cramond
Crewe Toll
Currie
Curriehill
Dalmahoy
Dalry
Davidson's Mains
Dean Village
Drumbrae
Drylaw
Duddingston
Dumbiedykes
East Craigs
East Pilton
Edinburgh
Edinburgh Park
Fairmilehead
Ferniehill
Ferry Road
Firrhill
Forrester
Fountainbridge
Gilmerton
Gogar
Gogarloch
Goldenacre
Gorgie
Gracemount
The Grange
Granton
Grassmarket
Greenbank
Greendykes
Greenhill
Haymarket
Hermiston
Holy Corner
Holyrood
Hunter's Tryst
The Inch
Ingliston
Inverleith
Jock's Lodge
Joppa
Juniper Green
Kaimes
Kingsknowe
Lauriston
Leith
Liberton
Little France
Lochend
Lochrin
Longstone
Marchmont
Maybury
Mayfield
Meadowbank
Merchiston
Moredun
Morningside
Mortonhall
Mountcastle
Muirhouse
Murrayfield
Newbridge
Newcraighall
Newhaven
Newington
Niddrie
Northfield
Oxgangs
Parkgrove
Parkhead
Piershill
Pilrig
Pilton
Polworth
Portobello
Powderhall
Prestonfield
Ratho
Ratho Station
Ravelston
Redford
Restalrig
Riccarton
Roseburn
Saughton
Sciennes
Seafield
Shandon
Sighthill
Silverknowes
Slateford
South Gyle
Stenhouse
Stockbridge
Swanston
Tollcross
Torphin
Trinity
Turnhouse
Warriston
West Coates
West Craigs
West End
Westfield
Wester Broom
Wester Hailes
Western Harbour
West Pilton
Willowbrae

Transferred to East Lothian

Fisherrow
Inveresk
Monktonhall
Musselburgh
Wallyford
Whitecraig

Transferred to Scottish Borders
Heriot
Stow of Wedale

Transferred to West Lothian

Adambrae 
Addiewell
Bellsquarry
Breich
Cobbinshaw
Craigshill 
Dedridge
East Calder 
Harburn 
Howden
Kirknewton
Mid Calder 
Murieston 
Polbeth 
Pumpherston 
West Calder
Wilkieston

Places of interest

Arniston House
Borthwick Castle
Castlelaw Fort
Crichton Castle
Dalhousie Castle
Dalkeith Palace
Flotterstone
Hawthornden Castle
Midlothian Snowsports Centre, Hillend
National Mining Museum
Loanhead Memorial Park
Mavisbank House
Melville Castle
Newbattle Abbey
Pentland Hills
Roslin Castle
Roslin Glen Country Park
Roslin Institute
Rosslyn Chapel
Tyne-Esk Walk
Vogrie Country Park
Wallace's Cave

Civil parishes in the County of Midlothian 
(Unitary authority indicated where not Midlothian. Boundaries defined by Local Government (Scotland) Act 1973)

Borthwick
Carrington
Cockpen
Cranston
Crichton
Currie (Edinburgh)
Dalkeith
Fala and Soutra
Glencorse
Heriot (Scottish Borders)
Inveresk (East Lothian)
Kirkliston (Edinburgh)
Kirknewton (West Lothian)
Lasswade
Mid Calder (West Lothian)
Newbattle
Newton
Penicuik
Ratho (Edinburgh)
Stow (Scottish Borders)
Temple
West Calder (West Lothian)

Former civil parishes outside Edinburgh now merged in the City of Edinburgh 

Abolished 1902:
Duddingston

Abolished 1920

Colinton
Corstorphine
Cramond
Liberton

The above list does not include parishes which have been within the City of Edinburgh for county purposes since 19th century, namely within the "County of the City" of which the Lord Provost was and is Lord Lieutenant.

Transport
Midlothian has a modern road network as well as some rural single-track roads. The Borders Railway runs between Tweedbank to Edinburgh, with four stations in Midlothian – Shawfair, Eskbank, Newtongrange and Gorebridge.

Notable people associated with Midlothian

William Drummond of Hawthornden (1585–1649), Scottish poet.
 Princess Margaret of Scotland (1598–1600), daughter of James VI and I of Scotland and England (born Dalkeith Palace)
John Clerk of Penicuik, 2nd Baronet (1676–1755), was a Scottish politician, lawyer, judge, composer and architect.
William Robertson (1721–1793), historian, minister in the Church of Scotland, and Principal of the University of Edinburgh
Robert Smith (1722–1777), American architect, based in Philadelphia, Pennsylvania, born in Dalkeith
Hector Macneill (1746–1818), poet and songwriter, born near Roslin
John Clerk, Lord Eldin (1757–1832), Scottish judge, lived in Lasswade for several years.
Sir Walter Scott (1771–1832) wrote the novel The Heart of Midlothian and lived at Lasswade Cottage (now Sir Walter Scott's Cottage) in Lasswade from 1798 to 1804, where he wrote his Grey Brother, translation of Goetz von Berlichingen, etc. and was visited by Wordsworth.
William Tennant (1784–1848), the author of Anster Fair, was parish schoolmaster in Lasswade from 1816 to 1819.
Thomas de Quincey (1785–1859), author of Confessions of an English Opium-Eater (1822), lived in Man's Bush Cottage (now De Quincey Cottage), Polton, from 1840 until his death in 1859.
Thomas Murray (1792–1872), the Gallovidian author, died in Lasswade.
William Ewart Gladstone (1809–1898), MP for Midlothian 1880–1895 and conducted his famous Midlothian campaign across the UK in 1880
Patrick Edward Dove (1815–1873), mainly remembered for his book The Theory of Human Progression, born at Lasswade
John Lawson Johnston (1839–1900), the creator of Bovril, born at Roslin.
Charles W. Nibley (1849–1931), Scottish-American religious leader in the Church of Jesus Christ of Latter-day Saints (LDS Church). Nibley was served as second counselor in the First Presidency to Heber J. Grant (1925–31), and Presiding Bishop (1907–25).
Charles Thomson Rees Wilson (1869–1959) of Glencorse, Nobel prize-winning physicist.
George Forrest (1873–1932), a plant collector who gained fame with his expeditions to the far east who spent a significant part of his early years in Loanhead.
Sir William MacTaggart (1903–1981), artist, and grandson of the artist William McTaggart, he became President of the Society of Scottish Artists, President of the Royal Scottish Academy, and Trustee of the National Museum of Antiquities.
Charles Forte, Baron Forte (1908–2007), the hotelier, worked in an Italian cafe in Loanhead, on his arrival in Scotland from Italy.
Karl Miller (1931–2014), founding editor of the London Review of Books and Lord Northcliffe Professor of Modern English Literature at University College, London (1974–1992), born in Straiton.
Annette Crosbie (born 1934), actress, born in Gorebridge
Ishbel MacAskill (1941–2011), heritage activist and traditional Scottish Gaelic singer and teacher
Gary Naysmith from Loanhead (born 1978), Scottish International Footballer who played for Heart of Midlothian and Everton. He was named Scottish PFA Young Player of the Year in 1998. He won the Scottish Cup with Hearts in 1998.
Darren Fletcher (born 1984), from Mayfield Dalkeith. Scotland International footballer and holds the record of being the youngest player to captain his national side, and was part of the Manchester United squad that won the UEFA Champions League in the 2007–2008 season.
Steven Whittaker from Bonnyrigg, (born 1984), Scotland International footballer, ex-Hibernian F.C. and Rangers F.C.

Schools in Midlothian

Primary schools

Bilston Primary School, Bilston
Bonnyrigg Primary School, Bonnyrigg
Burnbrae Primary School, Hopefield 
Cornbank St James Primary School, Penicuik
Cuiken Primary School, Penicuik
Danderhall Primary School, Danderhall
Gore Glen Primary School, Gorebridge
Gorebridge Primary School, Gorebridge
Hawthornden Primary School, Bonnyrigg
King's Park Primary School, Dalkeith
Lasswade Primary School, Lasswade 
Lawfield Primary School, Mayfield
Loanhead Primary School, Loanhead
Mauricewood Primary School, Penicuik
Mayfield Primary School, Mayfield
Moorfoot Primary School, North Middleton
Newtongrange Primary School, Newtongrange
Paradykes Primary School, Loanhead
Rosewell Primary School, Rosewell
Roslin Primary School, Roslin
Sacred Heart RC Primary School, Penicuik
St Andrews's RC Primary School Gorebridge
St David's RC Primary School Dalkeith
St Luke's RC Primary School, Mayfield
St Margaret's RC Primary School, Loanhead
St Mary's RC Primary School, Bonnyrigg
St Matthew's RC Primary School, Rosewell
Stobhill Primary School, Gorebridge
Strathesk Primary School, Penicuik
Tynewater Primary School, Pathhead
Woodburn Primary School, Woodburn

Secondary schools
Beeslack High School, Penicuik
Dalkeith High School, Dalkeith
Lasswade High School Centre, Bonnyrigg
Newbattle Community High School, Mayfield
Penicuik High School, Penicuik
St. David's RC High School, Dalkeith

Special schools
Saltersgate School, Dalkeith
Top Services Pathhead

Twin towns and sister cities
Midlothian is twinned with Komárom-Esztergom, Hungary and Kreis Heinsberg, Germany. It is a sister city with Midlothian, Illinois, a suburb of Chicago a town of Illinois.

References

External links

 
Lieutenancy areas of Scotland
Districts of Scotland
Counties of Scotland
Council areas of Scotland
Counties of the United Kingdom (1801–1922)